Robert Pacho (August 1, 1911 – May 1, 1978) was an American professional boxer who competed from 1928 to 1941, twice challenging for the welterweight world title in 1939. After Bert Colima's career was over, Pacho was Mexican fans' most popular boxer.

Early life
Pacho broke into the professional boxing ranks while working as a farm mechanic in El Centro, California.

Professional career
Pacho fought many well known fighters during his career, including legends Barney Ross, and Henry Armstrong. His career lasted from 1929–1941 and his professional record was 78-67-15 with 37 Knockouts.

His two bouts with Henry Armstrong were for the world Welterweight title, one held in Havana, Cuba. Pacho lost both by fourth round technical knockout.

References

External links

American boxers of Mexican descent
Boxers from Arizona
Welterweight boxers
1911 births
1978 deaths
American male boxers